Gilead is the name of three persons and two places in the Bible.

Gilead may also refer to:

Places

Australia
 Gilead, New South Wales, a suburb of Sydney

United States
 Gilead, Connecticut, a village in the town of Hebron
 Gilead, Illinois, an unincorporated community 
 Gilead, Indiana, an unincorporated community
 Gilead, Maine, a town
 Former Gilead Railroad Station, Maine, on the National Register of Historic Places
 Gilead Township, Michigan
 Gilead, Missouri, an unincorporated community
 Gilead, Nebraska, a village
 Lake Gilead, New York, a reservoir
 Gilead Township, Morrow County, Ohio

People with the name
 Gilead Sher (born 1953), Israeli attorney, government official and peace negotiator
 Gilead J. Wilmot (1834–?), American politician

Arts and entertainment
 Gil'ead, a city in the kingdom of Alagaësia in Christopher Paolini's novel Eragon
 Gilead, the fictional birthplace of Roland Deschain in Stephen King's The Dark Tower series of novels 
 Republic of Gilead, the fictional totalitarian theocratic nation in Margaret Atwood's dystopian novel The Handmaid's Tale
 Gilead (novel), a 2004 novel by Marilynne Robinson
 Gilead, a novelette by Zenna Henderson in her Ingathering series

Other uses
 Gilead Sciences, an American  biopharmaceutical company based in California 
 Watchtower Bible School of Gilead, Jehovah's Witnesses' missionary training program in New York state, aka the Gilead School
 Gilead (tribal group), mentioned in the Bible
 Gilead, a Jaredite military commander in the Book of Mormon

See also
 Mount Gilead (disambiguation)
 Ghilad, a commune in Timiș County, Romania
 Gilad (disambiguation)
 Balm of Gilead (disambiguation)

Masculine given names